Jesper Westerberg (born 1 February 1986) is a retired Swedish footballer who played as a right back.

Career 

Started his career in Arkelstorps IF before moving to IFÖ Bromölla IF, and later on to Landskrona BoIS. In 2003, he made his first appearance in the Swedish highest league Allsvenskan, but he played only one match for the club between 2003–2005, during the 2005 season he was loaned out to IFK Hässleholm and in 2006 he joined Halmstads BK.

On 4 October 2008 Westerberg said that he would not renew his contract with Halmstads BK, which ended after the 2008 season, on 20 March 2009 Landskrona confirmed that Westerberg had signed a one-year contract with the club. After one year in Landskrona he moved to Mjällby AIF.

In December 2011 it was announced that Westerberg had signed a contract with the Norwegian club Lillestrøm SK.

Retirement
On 23 October 2019 Halmstads BK confirmed, that 33-year old Westerberg had decided to retire at the end of the season. However, the club announced on 7 January 2020, that Westerberg would continue at the club in a different role as a salesman in the club's marketing department.

References

External links 
 
 
 
  

1986 births
Living people
Swedish footballers
Swedish expatriate footballers
Sweden under-21 international footballers
Sweden youth international footballers
Association football defenders
Allsvenskan players
Superettan players
Eliteserien players
Landskrona BoIS players
Halmstads BK players
Mjällby AIF players
Lillestrøm SK players
Swedish expatriate sportspeople in Norway
Expatriate footballers in Norway
People from Kristianstad Municipality
Footballers from Skåne County